Downsborough is an English surname. Notable people with the surname include:

Ian Downsborough (born 1972), Australian rules footballer
Peter Downsborough (1943–2019), English footballer

English-language surnames